Cyrus Sutton (born 1982, San Diego, California) is an American director and professional surfer.
Growing up in Southern California and dividing his time between the coast and mountains, Sutton's inventive approach to filmmaking became the basis of the outdoor surf website Korduroy.tv Growing up near the ocean and participating in water sports such as body surfing, bodyboarding and surfing, he sought to use cinematography to document the surf culture around him and on his travels. His commercial clients include Adidas, Apple, Corona, Reef, and Patagonia. His career has been well documented by various national publications such as Surfer Magazine and The New York Times.

Education 

Before graduating Los Alamitos High School in 2000, Sutton lived in Japan with his father where he received his middle school education while attending Fukuoka International School, Fukuoka, Japan.

Career 

1999–2002 – Professional surfer until age twenty and again in 2007 at age twenty-five. He is still presently surfing professionally, earning the cover of The Surfer's Journal in 2011.
2002–2003 – Editor and writer at Opper Sports Productions
2006–2008 – In-house multimedia consultant at Ubiquity Records
2009–2010 – Director for Landia Productions
2009–Present; Sutton created Korduroy Productions and serves as the company's founder and creative director.
2011–present – Brand ambassador for Reef
2013–present – Brand ambassador for Leatherman

Films 

 (2003) Riding Waves  ASIN B002DVPKDG – Sutton's first film, covering then surfer amateur Dane Reynolds in 2003 when Cyrus was only 19 years old.
 (2005) Next Wave: A Tsunami Relief Story  The Pacific Southwest Region of the National Academy of Television Arts & Sciences awarded an EMMY® to "The Next Wave, a tsunami relief story for Best Topical Documentary.
 (2005) Under the Sun  ASIN B0063F8E90 – A 16mm documentary film featuring surfing from Dave Rastovich, Beau Young, Nat Young. Filmed in Australia's Byron Bay and Gold Coast, Under the Sun depicts the roots of commercialism in the surfing culture.
 (2009) Tom's Creation Plantation A Peels Production: ASIN B003IGMFU6 – Paying homage to the original surfers this film explores surfing on an alaia and also includes a tutorial on how to shape your own finless surfboard alaia.
 (2011) Stoked and Broke – A San Diego staycation of sorts this surfari epic was filmed on a zero budget as Cyrus Sutton and Ryan Burch make their own surfboards, solar cookers and hobo stoves and head off on a thirty-mile, eight-day adventure through San Diego, Ca.
 (2013) Compassing Cyrus Sutton embarks on a surfing adventure through the western side of North America as he customizes his van into a unique camper for his journey on the road.
 (2013) Homeland Homeland is a short film about the Basque Country surfing culture and the Basque people.
 (2012) Another Day in the Life of Wayne Lynch This film follows Australian Hall of Fame Surfer Wayne Lynch and takes a look back at his surfing career and contributions to the shortboard.

Awards and accolades 

 2003 – Best Cinematography at X-Dance Film Fest for Riding Waves
 2005 – Emmy Award Best Southwest Region Documentary for Next Wave: A Tsunami Relief Story
 2009 – Best Short Film at Yallingup Surf Film Fest for Tom's Creation Plantation
 2010 – Best Story X-Dance Film Fest, Best Film Canadian Surf Film Fest, Best Film Anglet Surf Film Fest, Best Film Surfilm Festival San Sebastián, Best Film London Surf Film Fest for Stoked and Broke
 2012 – Best Short Film, San Diego Surf Film Fest Another Day in the Life of Wayne Lynch

Sponsors 

 Reef
 Leatherman
 GoPro
Beaming

References

External links 
 Korduroy.tv
 Regressing Forward 
 Peak Hounding

1982 births
Living people
American directors
American photographers
American cinematographers
Artists from California
People from Encinitas, California